Only Human is the debut studio album by English singer-songwriter Calum Scott, released on 9 March 2018 through Capitol Records. The album was re-released in November 2018 as the "special edition" featuring four additional tracks.

Critical reception

Only Human received generally positive reviews from music critics. David from auspOp gave the album four of out five, and complimented the "personal" lyrics, writing: "Most of the songs here are a great listen and you can appreciate the effort that's gone into creating such a great debut". Francesca Lamaina of Renowned for Sound gave the album three out of five stars, saying: "Only Human is a decent debut album... Some tracks lack of spirit and suffocates among incessant repetitions. However, Calum Scott's voice is incredibly wonderful." Nick Lavine of Gay Times gave the album four of out five and said that "Only Human offers a classy assortment of soulful stompers, gospel-tinged ballads and more reflective downtempo moments", adding: "This is an impressive and affecting debut that proves there’s much more to Calum Scott than a kinda surprising Robyn cover."

Track listing

Notes
 [a] signifies the remixer.
 Stop Myself (Only Human) samples Human by The Human League.

Charts

Weekly charts

Year-end charts

Certifications

References

External links
 

2018 debut albums
Calum Scott albums
Albums produced by Fraser T. Smith
Albums produced by Jon Maguire
Albums produced by Oak Felder